Pacheri is a village in the state of Rajasthan, India. It has a population of over 3974 residents.

Geography
It has an average elevation of 291 metres (958 feet).

References

Villages in Jhunjhunu district